Stuart Silver is a screenwriter, television writer, actor and director. He works solo and collaboratively and is co-founder of the BAFTA-nominated, performance duo Noble and Silver, who won the 2000 Perrier Award (now the Foster's Edinburgh Comedy Awards) for Best Newcomer.  Stuart has since appeared on stage in his own one-man show, You Look Like Ants and in shorter pieces. He has also featured in television shows such as Get Off Me, The Mighty Boosh, Garth Marenghi's Darkplace, and Man to Man with Dean Learner.

Career

Noble and Silver 

Stuart Silver and his writing and performance partner Kim Noble first came to national prominence upon winning the Best Newcomer Perrier Award in 2000. Trained in fine art at Sheffield Hallam University, the duo received as much praise from the art community as from comedy aficionados.  Their work drew together visual art, stand-up, theatre, spoken word and performance art.

Noble and Silver's post-Perrier shows include the 2001 Edinburgh Festival Fringe show in Pleasance Above which was a collage of video, recorded sound and performance and a month-long residency in London's Beaconsfield art space, entitled We're Spending Four Weeks at Beaconsfield, So Let's Hope Everything Goes OK.

In spring 2001, the UK digital channel, E4 commissioned a six-part series entitled Noble and Silver: Get Off Me!.

Solo work 
In 2010 Stuart created a solo piece You Look Like Ants and performed it at the London Word Festival and Soho Theatre. You Look Like Ants is a monologue and musical performance that interweaves several narratives non-sequentially.  Stuart plays electric ukulele during the piece.

Stuart has twice collaborated with the contemporary performance duo Lone Twin, co-writing and co-directing Cabaret Simon for The Barbican, London in December 2009.  For Lone Twin, he also produced the in-show video for Beastie.

Stuart is the lead mentor for musician, spoken word artist collaborations for Phrased & Confused.

References

External links

Living people
British performance artists
British comedians
Alumni of Sheffield Hallam University
Year of birth missing (living people)